Amphitorna perexcisa is a moth in the family Drepanidae. It was described by Warren in 1923. It is found in Malaysia and on Borneo, Bali, Java and Sumatra.

References

Moths described in 1923
Drepaninae
Moths of Asia